Kanako is a feminine Japanese given name.

Possible writings
, "addition, (means nothing on its own), child"
, "fragrance, (means nothing on its own), child"
, "good, fine, etc., south, child"
, "fragrance, vegetables, child"
, "acceptable, south, child"

People with the name
, Japanese wheelchair tennis player
, Japanese actor and model
, Japanese actor
, Japanese actor
, Japanese volleyball player
, Japanese singer
, Japanese women's footballer
, Japanese voice actor
Kanako Miyamoto, (born 1989), Japanese voice actress and singer
, Japanese figure skater
 Kanako Murata
, Japanese female volleyball player
, Japanese volleyball player
, Japanese politician and activist
, Japanese voice actress
, Japanese voice actress and singer
, Japanese cyclist
, Japanese voice actor
, Japanese voice actress
, Japanese professional wrestler, journalist and artist
, Japanese swimmer
, Japanese actor and comedian
, Japanese badminton player

Fictional characters
, a character from Touhou Project
, a character in the light novel series Oreimo

Japanese feminine given names